The following are the football (soccer) events of the year 1927 throughout the world.

Events
Cardiff City FC become the first football team from outside England to win the FA Cup beating Arsenal FC 1-0 in the final. The goal was scored by Hughie Ferguson who was played by Gary Dobbs in the 2007 Welsh TV recreation of the famous match.
May 24 – Chilean club Universidad de Chile established
November 1 – Peru plays its first ever international match. In Lima the hosts are beaten by Uruguay: 0-4.

Club formed in 1927
A.S. Roma

Winners club national championship
 Denmark: B93
 England: Newcastle United
 Greece: Regional Championships:
 EPSA (Athens) Panathinaikos
 EPSP (Pireas) Olympiacos
 EPSM (Thessaloniki)  Iraklis
 EPSP (Patras) A.P.S. Olympiakos Patras
 Iceland: KR
 Italy: no championships
 Kingdom of Serbs, Croats and Slovenes: Hajduk Split
 Paraguay: Olimpia Asunción
 Poland: Wisła Kraków
 Scotland:
Division One: Rangers F.C.
Scottish Cup: Celtic F.C.
 Turkey: Muhafızgücü

International tournaments
1927 British Home Championship (October 20, 1926 – April 9, 1927)
Shared by  & 

 1924-28 Nordic Football Championship (June 15, 1924 – October 7, 1928) 1927: (June 19 – October 30, 1927)
 (1927)
 (1924-1928)

 South American Championship 1927 in Peru (October 30, 1927 – November 27, 1927)

Births
 January 18 – Werner Liebrich, German international footballer (died 1995)
 January 26 – Victor Mees, Belgian international footballer (died 2012)
 January 28 – Karl Bögelein, German international footballer and coach (died 2016)
 March 1 –George Davies, English footballer 
 March 2 – Erol Keskin, Turkish international footballer (died 2016)
 March 27 – Karl Stotz, Austrian international footballer and manager (died 2017)
 April 1
Walter Bahr, American soccer player (died 2018)
Ferenc Puskás, Hungarian international forward (died 2016)
 April 6 – Harry Beitzel, Australian football umpire, broadcaster (died 2017)
 April 30 – Johann Zeitler, German footballer (died 2018)
 May 2 – Víctor Rodríguez Andrade, Uruguayan international footballer (died 1985)
 May 3 – Günter Schröter, East German international footballer (died 2016)
 May 9 – Juan José Pizzuti, Argentine footballer and manager (died 2020)
 June 16 – Ya'akov Hodorov, Israeli international football goalkeeper (died 2006)
 July 22 – Dagoberto Moll, Uruguayan footballer and manager
 October 14 – Emil Pažický, Slovak international footballer (died 2003)
 October 19 – Hans Schäfer, German international footballer (died 2017)
 December 5 – Omar Oscar Míguez, Uruguayan footballer (died 2006)

Deaths

References 

 
Association football by year